Brigadier-General Lumley Owen Williames Jones  (1 December 1876 – 14 September 1918) was the last British General officer to die on the Somme.

Born in 1887 at Llandyssil in Wales, Jones was the son of Richard and Catherine Jones of Cefn Bryntalch. He attended Winchester College from 1890 to 1895. He had started the First World War as a captain in the 2nd Battalion, Essex Regiment and took part in nearly every battle on the Western Front during World War I.  By 1918 he reached the rank of brigadier general and was commander of the 13th Brigade. He was also made a DSO, Chevalier of the Legion of Honour (France) and Officer of the Order of Saints Maurice and Lazarus (Italy).

Jones died of pneumonia on 14 September 1918 aged 41 and was buried at the Bagneux British Cemetery at Gezaincourt. He was the last of 12 British general officers to die on the Somme.

References

1870s births
1918 deaths
Welsh military personnel
British Army brigadiers
British Army generals of World War I
British military personnel killed in World War I
Essex Regiment officers
Chevaliers of the Légion d'honneur
Companions of the Distinguished Service Order
People from Montgomeryshire
Deaths from pneumonia in France
Recipients of the Order of Saints Maurice and Lazarus
Burials at Bagneux British Cemetery
People educated at Winchester College